Holderman is a surname. Notable people with the surname include:

Colin Holderman (born 1995), American baseball player
James B. Holderman (1936–2021), American academic and president of the University of South Carolina
James F. Holderman (born 1946), United States federal judge
Nelson M. Holderman (1885–1953), United States Army officer

See also
Holderman's Grove raid, occurred in Holderman's Grove, near Fox River (Illinois River tributary)